"Jean the Birdman" is a collaboration between Robert Fripp and David Sylvian, co-written by Trey Gunn. The dreamlike music video was directed by Howard Greenhalgh a year before he became famous for his work on Soundgarden's "Black Hole Sun".
The single was released as two separate CDs, each including exclusive bonus tracks.

The Exclusive B-sides 

"Earthbound (Starblind)" was co-written by Fripp and Sylvian, and was effectively in two parts, Sylvian singing a melodic verse and chorus over a simple acoustic guitar, which then gave way to a 6 minute Fripp soundscape of guitar and Frippertronics. 

"Endgame" was a simple piece, again dominated by Sylvian's verse chorus vocal over a simple acoustic guitar accompaniment. Sylvian explained: "These pieces were written after the completion of the Rain Tree Crow project. Lyrically, there is still this connection with that early material. I guess I hadn't worked the themes out of system entirely with Rain Tree Crow."

On "Tallow Moon" Sylvian spoke the lyrics of a poem. The lyrics are taken from "Lettre Au Directeur Des Messageries Maritimes", released on Hector Zazou's album Sahara Blue. "Dark Water" was a ambient soundscape by Fripp.

Track listing

Part 1 

 "Jean the Birdman" (Fripp, Trey Gunn, Sylvian) - 4:12
 "Earthbound (Starblind)" (Fripp, Sylvian) - 10:14
 "Endgame" (Sylvian) - 2:22

Part 2 

 "Jean the Birdman" (Fripp, Gunn, Sylvian) - 4:12
 "Gone to Earth" (Fripp, Sylvian) - 3:04
 "Tallow Moon" (Sylvian) - 5:44
 "Dark Water" (Fripp) - 6:45

Charts

Release history

References 

1993 songs
1993 singles
David Sylvian songs
Songs written by Robert Fripp
Songs written by David Sylvian
Songs written by Trey Gunn
Music videos directed by Howard Greenhalgh